Alexei Arkhipovich Leonov (30 May 1934 – 11 October 2019) was a Soviet and Russian cosmonaut, Air Force major general, writer, and artist. On 18 March 1965, he became the first person to conduct a spacewalk, exiting the capsule during the Voskhod 2 mission for 12 minutes and 9 seconds. He was also selected to be the first Soviet person to land on the Moon although the project was cancelled.

In July 1975, Leonov commanded the Soyuz capsule in the Apollo-Soyuz mission, which docked in space for two days with an American Apollo capsule.

Early life and military service 
Leonov was born on 30 May 1934 in Listvyanka, West Siberian Krai, Russian SFSR. His grandfather had been forced to relocate to Siberia for his role in the 1905 Russian Revolution. Alexei was the eighth of nine surviving children born to Yevdokia  and Arkhip. His father was an electrician and miner.

In 1936, his father was arrested and declared an "enemy of the people". Leonov wrote in his autobiography: "He was not alone: many were being arrested. It was part of a conscientious drive by the authorities to eradicate anyone who showed too much independence or strength of character. These were the years of Stalin's purges. Many disappeared into remote gulags and were never seen again." 

The family moved in with one of his married sisters in Kemerovo. His father rejoined the family in Kemerovo after he was released. He was compensated for his wrongful imprisonment. Leonov used art as a way to provide more food for the family. He began his art career by drawing flowers on ovens and later painted landscapes on canvasses.

The Soviet government encouraged its citizens to move to Soviet-occupied Prussia, so in 1948 his family relocated to Kaliningrad. Leonov graduated from secondary school (No. 21) in 1953. He applied to the Academy of Arts in Riga, Latvia, but decided not to attend due to the high tuition costs. Leonov decided to join a Ukrainian preparatory flying school in Kremenchug. He made his first solo flight in May 1955. While indulging in his passion for art by studying part-time in Riga, Leonov started an advanced two-year course to become a fighter pilot at the Chuguev Higher Air Force Pilots School in the Ukrainian SSR.

On 30 October 1957, Leonov graduated with an honours degree and was commissioned a lieutenant in the 113th Parachute Aviation Regiment, part of the 10th Engineering Aviation Division of the 69th Air Army in Kyiv. On 13 December 1959, he married Svetlana Pavlovna Dozenko. The next day he moved to East Germany to his new assignment with the 294th Reconnaissance Regiment of the 24th Air Army.

Soviet space program

He was one of the 20 Soviet Air Forces pilots selected to be part of the first cosmonaut training group in 1960. As with most cosmonauts, Leonov was a member of the Communist Party of the Soviet Union. His walk in space was originally to have taken place on the Voskhod 1 mission, but this was cancelled, and the historic event happened on the Voskhod 2 flight instead. He was outside the spacecraft for 12 minutes and nine seconds on 18 March 1965, connected to the craft by a  tether. 

At the end of the spacewalk, Leonov's spacesuit had inflated in the vacuum of space to the point where he could not re-enter the airlock. He opened a valve to allow some of the suit's pressure to bleed off and was barely able to get back inside the capsule. While on the mission, Leonov drew a small sketch of an orbital sunrise, producing the first ever work of art made in outer space. Leonov had spent eighteen months undergoing weightlessness training for the mission.

In 1968, Leonov was selected to be commander of a circumlunar Soyuz 7K-L1 flight. This was cancelled because of delays in achieving a reliable circumlunar flight (only the later Zond 7 and Zond 8 members of the programme were successful) and the Apollo 8 mission had already achieved that step in the Space Race. He was also selected to be the first Soviet person to land on the Moon, aboard the LOK/N1 spacecraft. This project was also cancelled. (The design required a spacewalk between lunar vehicles, something that contributed to his selection.) Leonov was to have been commander of the 1971 Soyuz 11 mission to Salyut 1, the first crewed space station, but his crew was replaced with the backup after one of the members, cosmonaut Valery Kubasov, was suspected to have contracted tuberculosis (the other member was Pyotr Kolodin).

Leonov was to have commanded the next mission to Salyut 1, but this was scrapped after the deaths of the Soyuz 11 crew members, and the space station was lost. The next two Salyuts (actually the military Almaz station) were lost at launch or failed soon after, and Leonov's crew stood by. By the time Salyut 4 reached orbit, Leonov had been switched to a more prestigious project.

Leonov's second trip into space was as commander of Soyuz 19, the Soviet half of the 1975 Apollo-Soyuz mission—the first joint space mission between the Soviet Union and the United States.
During the project Leonov became lasting friends with the US commander Thomas P. Stafford, with Leonov being the godfather of Stafford's younger children. Stafford gave a eulogy in Russian at Leonov's funeral in October 2019.

From 1976 to 1982, Leonov was the commander of the cosmonaut team ("Chief Cosmonaut") and deputy director of the Yuri Gagarin Cosmonaut Training Center, where he oversaw crew training. He also edited the cosmonaut newsletter Neptune. He retired in 1992.

Later life and death 

Leonov was an accomplished artist whose published books include albums of his artistic works and works he did in collaboration with his friend Andrei Sokolov. Leonov took coloured pencils and paper into space, where he sketched the Earth, becoming the first artist in space, and drew portraits of the Apollo astronauts who flew with him during the 1975 Apollo–Soyuz Test Project. 

Arthur C. Clarke wrote in his notes to his 1982 novel 2010: Odyssey Two that, after a 1968 screening of 2001: A Space Odyssey, Leonov pointed out to him that the alignment of the Moon, Earth, and Sun shown in the opening is essentially the same as that in Leonov's 1967 painting Near the Moon, although the painting's diagonal framing of the scene was not replicated in the film. Clarke kept an autographed sketch of this painting—which Leonov made after the screening—hanging on his office wall. Clarke dedicated 2010: Odyssey Two to Leonov and Soviet physicist Andrei Sakharov. The fictional spaceship in the book is named Cosmonaut Alexei Leonov.

Together with Valentin Selivanov, Leonov wrote the script for the 1980 science fiction film The Orion Loop.

In 2001, he was a vice president of Moscow-based Alfa-Bank and an adviser to the first deputy of the Board.

In 2004, Leonov and former American astronaut David Scott began work on a dual memoir covering the history of the Space Race between the United States and the Soviet Union. Titled Two Sides of the Moon: Our Story of the Cold War Space Race, it was published in 2006. Neil Armstrong and Tom Hanks both wrote introductions to the book.

Leonov was interviewed by Francis French for the 2007 book Into That Silent Sea by Colin Burgess and French.

Leonov died on 11 October 2019 after a long illness in Moscow. His funeral took place on 15 October. He was 85 and the last living member of the five cosmonauts in the Voskhod programme. He was survived by his wife Svetlana Dozenko, daughter Oksana, and two grandchildren; his other daughter, Viktoria, died in 1996.

Legacy 

 Worried about the Siberian wildlife, namely bears and wolves, while awaiting pick-up after landing, Alexei Leonov inspired the TP-82 Cosmonaut survival pistol, which was regularly carried by Cosmonaut expeditions from 1986 to 2007.
 The Leonov crater, near Mare Moscoviense (Sea of Moscow) on the far side of the Moon, was named after Leonov in 1970.
9533 Aleksejleonov, an asteroid first observed in 1981, was named for him.
 In the 1982 book 2010: Odyssey Two by Arthur C. Clarke the Soviet spaceship Alexei Leonov is named after the cosmonaut. The book is dedicated to Leonov and Andrei Sakharov.
 Leonov, along with Rusty Schweickart, established the Association of Space Explorers in 1985. Membership is open to all people who have orbited the Earth.
 Leonov created the image of Stephen Hawking for the medal, which was established by the Starmus Festival. Since 2015, it has been awarded for works contributing to the promotion of scientific knowledge in various fields, such as music, art, cinema. The portrait of Hawking painted by the astronaut is depicted on the front side of the "scientific Oscar". The reverse depicts Leonov's first spacewalk and Brian May's guitar, symbolizing the two main components of the festival. Leonov created the design for the reverse side in close cooperation with May. 
 The 2017 film The Age of Pioneers is based on Leonov's account of the Voskhod 2 mission. Leonov was portrayed by Yevgeny Mironov. He was a technical adviser for the movie; the director cut all scenes featuring Gagarin–about 40 minutes of film–so Leonov could be the focus.
 The song "E.V.A." by Public Service Broadcasting on their 2015 album, The Race for Space, references Leonov becoming the first man to undertake extravehicular activity in space.
 In the 2019 alternate history television series, For All Mankind, Leonov is portrayed as the first person to walk on the Moon.
 Leonov, a 2020 album by BlackWeald, is a dark ambient interpretation of the Voskhod 2 mission.
 At the 2022 on Starmus festival, held for the first time in the post-Soviet space, in Armenia, the premiere of the documentary film "Space Inside" about Alexei Leonov took place. It was introduced by the cosmonaut's daughter, Oksana Leonova. It is based on the last interview of the pioneer.

Soviet/Russian awards and honours 

 Twice Hero of the Soviet Union (23 March 1965 and 22 July 1975)
 Two Orders of Lenin (23 March 1965 and 22 July 1975)
 Pilot-Cosmonaut of the USSR (1965)
 Merited Master of Sport of the USSR (1965)
 Order of the Red Star (1961)
 Order for Service to the Homeland in the Armed Forces of the USSR, 3rd class (1975)
 Jubilee Medal "Twenty Years of Victory in the Great Patriotic War 1941–1945"
 Jubilee Medal "40 Years of the Armed Forces of the USSR"
 Jubilee Medal "50 Years of the Armed Forces of the USSR"
 Jubilee Medal "60 Years of the Armed Forces of the USSR"
 Jubilee Medal "70 Years of the Armed Forces of the USSR"
 Medal "Veteran of the Armed Forces of the USSR"
 Medals "For Impeccable Service", 1st, 2nd and 3rd classes
 Lenin Komsomol Prize (1980)
 USSR State Prize (1981)
 Order for Merit to the Fatherland, 4th class (2 March 2000)
 Order of Friendship (12 April 2011)
 Order "For Merit to the Fatherland", 3rd class (22 May 2014)
 Order "For Merit to the Fatherland", 1st class (29 May 2019)

Foreign awards 
Hero of Socialist Labour (People's Republic of Bulgaria, 1965)
 Order of Georgi Dimitrov (People's Republic of Bulgaria, 1965)
  (German Democratic Republic, 1965)
 Order of Karl Marx (German Democratic Republic, 1965)
 Order of the Flag of the Republic of Hungary (1965)
 Hero of Labor (Democratic Republic of Vietnam, 1966)
 Order of Civil Merit, 1st class (Syria, 1966)
 Order of Merit, 3rd class (Ukraine, 2011)

Public organizations 

 1975 Gold Space Medal from the Fédération Aéronautique Internationale (FAI) in 1976. FAI created an exception which allowed Thomas P. Stafford to be awarded it alongside him; typically the award is restricted to one person per year.
 International Space Hall of Fame (1976)
 International Air & Space Hall of Fame, inducted in 2001, along with Valeri Kubasov, Vance D. Brand, Deke Slayton, and Thomas P. Stafford
 Ludwig Nobel Prize (2007)
 Elmer A. Sperry Award (US, 2008), with Konstantin Bushuyev, Thomas P. Stafford, and Glynn Lunney
 Order of Saint Constantine the Great (Union of the Golden Knights of the Order of St. Constantine the Great)
 Order "Golden Star" (Foundation Heroes of the Soviet Union and Heroes of the Russian Federation)
 Order the "Pride of Russia" (Foundation for the "Pride of the Fatherland", 2007)
 National Award "To the Glory of the Fatherland" in the "Glory to Russia" class (International Academy of Social Sciences and International Academy of patronage, 2008)
 Order of "the Glory of the Fatherland", 2nd class (2008)
 2011 co-founder and the member of board of directors of the international festival of science, space and music Starmus together with astrophysicist Garik Israelyan, musician of the band Queen Brian May, scientist-educator Stephen Hawking, a number of astronauts and Nobel laureates.

Other awards and titles 
 Commander of the Order of Saint Anna III degree (2008), by Grand Duchess Maria Vladimirovna of Russia
 Commander of the Order of Saint Anna II degree (2011), by Grand Duchess Maria Vladimirovna of Russia
 Honorary member of the Russian Academy of Arts

See also 
 Attempted assassination of Leonid Brezhnev (Moscow, 1969), in which a gunman fired 14 shots at a limousine carrying Leonov and other cosmonauts.

Notes

References

Sources

Further reading 
 
 
 "Testing of rocket and space technology – the business of my life" Events and facts – A. I. Ostashev, Korolyov, 2001.New Page 1;
 "Rockets and people" – B. E. Chertok, M: "mechanical engineering", 1999.  
 "Bank of the Universe" – edited by Boltenko A. C., Kyiv, 2014., publishing house "Phoenix", 
 A.I. Ostashev, Sergey Pavlovich Korolyov – The Genius of the 20th Century — 2010 M. of Public Educational Institution of Higher Professional Training MGUL .
 S. P. Korolev. Encyclopedia of life and creativity – edited by C. A. Lopota, RSC Energia. S. P. Korolev, 2014

External links 

A video of his spacewalk
The Voskhod 2 mission revisited
Science fiction art by Leonov and Sokolov. Extensive gallery, with annotation. 
The official website of the city administration Baikonur – Honorary citizens of Baikonur
Alexeï Léonov, the Spacewalker, Vladimir Kozlov's film, France-Russia, 2011

 
1934 births
2019 deaths
1965 in spaceflight
20th-century Russian painters
21st-century Russian painters
Apollo–Soyuz Test Project
Burials at the Federal Military Memorial Cemetery
Extravehicular activity
Heroes of Socialist Labour
Heroes of the Soviet Union
Honorary Members of the Russian Academy of Arts
People from Kemerovo Oblast
Recipients of the Order "For Merit to the Fatherland", 1st class
Recipients of the Lenin Komsomol Prize
Recipients of the Order of Georgi Dimitrov
Recipients of the Order of Lenin
Recipients of the Order of Merit (Ukraine), 3rd class
Recipients of the USSR State Prize
Russian cosmonauts
Russian explorers
Russian male painters
Russian speculative fiction artists
Soviet Air Force generals
Soviet major generals
Soviet painters
Space artists
Voskhod program cosmonauts
Spacewalkers
20th-century Russian male artists
21st-century Russian male artists